Juergen Boos (born 9 May 1961 in Lörrach, Germany) is the President and CEO of Frankfurt Book Fair.

Biography 
Juergen Boos trained as a publisher at Herder Verlag (Freiburg) in the early 1980s and has degrees in both Marketing and Organisational Theory. He has held management positions at Droemer Knaur Verlag (Munich), Carl Hanser Verlag (Munich), as well as Springer Science and Business Media (Berlin) and John Wiley & Sons (Weinheim).

Boos became President and CEO of the Frankfurter Buchmesse GmbH (Frankfurt Book Fair) in 2005 and is President of LITPROM (Society for the Promotion of African, Asian and Latin American Literature) and Managing Director of LitCam (Frankfurter Buchmesse Literacy Campaign). In January 2017, Boos received an honorary degree from the Ivane Javakhishvili Tbilisi State University. He is also a member of the Scientific Committee of Sheikh Zayed Book Award and a member of Akademie Deutscher Buchpreis (German Book Prize Academy).

Controversies 

In 2009 when China was the 'guest country' of the Frankfurt Book Fair, Boos ran into controversy.  After a protest of the official Chinese delegation, Boos excluded two Chinese dissident writers from a symposium.  Boos later reversed his decision, prompting another Chinese protest.

Boos later explained in an official statement that the Frankfurt Book Fair always was a "marketplace for freedom" and because of that having China as the annual 'guest country' was expected to be a tightrope walk in some fields. He furthermore explained that dialogue is always important and that no compromise at the expense of freedom of expression can be made. He also apologized to the public and to the two shortly excluded authors.

In 2015, Boos invited Salman Rushdie to be the speaker of the opening press conference of Frankfurter Buchmesse. The Iranian Government protested against this invitation and the Iranian Ministry of Culture cancelled their presence at the fair last minute.

References

External links 

 Interview with Juergen Boos in Publishing Perspectives

German chief executives
1961 births
Living people